Theatrhythm Final Bar Line is a rhythm game developed by indieszero and published by Square Enix for Nintendo Switch and PlayStation 4. It is the fifth entry in the Theatrhythm sub-series, following Theatrhythm Final Fantasy (2012), Theatrhythm Final Fantasy: Curtain Call (2014), Theatrhythm Dragon Quest (2015) and the arcade-exclusive Theatrhythm Final Fantasy: All-Star Carnival (2016). Its gameplay is mechanically similar to prior entries in the series, involving players timing inputs to various pieces of themed music. However, the assortment of music has been expanded to encompass various Square Enix franchises outside the flagship Final Fantasy series. It was released on February 16, 2023.

Gameplay 

As with prior entries, Theatrhythm Final Bar Line is a rhythm video game incorporating RPG elements. Players assume control of a party of characters from the Final Fantasy series.

Compared to the original and Curtain Call, note charts in Final Bar Line are the ones from All-Star Carnival and introduce multiple simultaneous inputs, sometimes calling for four inputs at once from any of the buttons (including shoulder buttons) or for two simultaneous Slide inputs moving both the left and right sticks in certain directions. Pair Mode, where two players can play together, also returns from All-Star Carnival, as does the added Supreme difficulty on some songs.

In addition, the multiplayer mode, Multi Battle, can now accommodate up to 4 players per room instead of just 2.

Music has been added since Curtain Call from Final Fantasy XIV, Final Fantasy XV and the Final Fantasy VII Remake in addition to the mobile Mobius Final Fantasy and Final Fantasy Record Keeper. In addition, music from other Square Enix games is available as paid downloadable content. Specifically, music from SaGa Frontier was available on release day, with packs to be released including music from Live A Live, The World Ends with You, Octopath Traveler, Nier, Xenogears, the Chrono series and the Mana series.

Reception

Critical reception

Theatrhythm Final Bar Line received "generally favorable" reviews, according to review aggregator Metacritic.

Nintendo World Report enjoyed the large amount of content present in the game, writing "The massive track list, fun gameplay, and cute aesthetic help keep me absorbed and have proven to be a dangerous catalyst to me, saying “one more song” over and over late into the night". Destructoid wrote that it made them appreciate each song more, "Everything in Final Bar Line feels so good because it’s apparent that the game wants you to experience the music through a new lens, not to play it on an instrument, but simply to understand the finer intricacies of the piece". While praising the title's new difficulty, IGN criticized the lack of a wider narrative, "The only letdown of the Series Quest mode is that besides unlocking songs and characters for other modes, there isn't a story or anything beyond the music itself to keep you hooked".

Sales

The Nintendo Switch version of Theatrhythm Final Bar Line was the sixth bestselling retail game during its first week of release in Japan, with 11,565 physical copies being sold across the country. The PlayStation 4 version sold 3,610 physical copies across Japan throughout the same week, making it the sixteenth bestselling retail game of the week in the country.

References 

2023 video games
Music video games
Nintendo Switch games
Final Fantasy video games
PlayStation 4 games
Video games developed in Japan
Video game sequels